Nina Hoss (born 7 July 1975) is a German stage and film actress.

Early life
Hoss was born in Stuttgart, West Germany. Her father, was a German trade unionist and politician (member of the Bundestag with The Greens). Her mother, was an actress at Stuttgart National Theatre and later director of the Esslingen-based Württemberg State Playhouse (Württembergische Landesbühne Esslingen).

Career
Hoss acted in radio plays at the age of seven and appeared on stage for the first time at the age of 14.

In 1997, Hoss graduated from the Ernst Busch Academy of Dramatic Arts in Berlin. Her first major success was the title role Rosemarie Nitribitt of Bernd Eichinger's A Girl Called Rosemary in 1996, a period drama (based on an actual scandal) set in the 1950s that looks back at the days of West Germany's postwar Wirtschaftswunder with, what a New York Times review calls a "curdling cynicism".

In 2000, Hoss was one of the Shooting Stars at the Berlinale. Her close collaboration with director Christian Petzold has been extremely successful: she won the 2003 Adolf Grimme Award for her role in his film Something to Remind Me and two years later the Adolf Grimme Award in Gold for Wolfsburg. Her performance of Yella, earned her the Silver Bear for Best Actress at the Berlin International Film Festival in 2007 and the German Film Award in 2008. Another collaboration with Petzold, Barbara, in which Hoss plays a doctor exiled to an East German provincial backwater in 1980, premiered at the Berlin International Film Festival in 2011 and the Toronto International Film Festival in 2012. In a review of her 2009 film A Woman in Berlin, The New York Times remarked that Hoss, "whose strong frame and graceful bearing suggest both old-style movie-star glamour and Aryan ideals of feminine beauty, is an actress of haunting subtlety, and the film, episodic, ambitious and a few beats too long, is held together by the force of her performance." The Washington Post, reviewing Phoenix (2015), again directed by Petzold, wrote "Hoss’s breathtaking portrayal, especially in the film’s final minutes, makes it clear why director Christian Petzold has made a habit of working with her". She later made her name in Hollywood playing a German agent in three seasons of the series Homeland (2014–17). Hoss starred in the 2020 miniseries The Defeated, and will be a series regular in season three of Tom Clancy's Jack Ryan in 2022.

As a stage actress, Hoss was an ensemble member at the Deutsches Theater in Berlin from 1998 to 2013, where she appeared as Medea and as Franziska in Minna von Barnhelm (2005). In 2013, she joined the ensemble of the Schaubühne theatre in Berlin. There, she starred in three productions by director Thomas Ostermeier, including Lillian Hellman's 'Little Foxes' (2014) and the world premiere of Yasmina Reza's Bella Figura (2015). In his stage production (2017) of Didier Eribon's book Returning to Reims, her starring role drew autobiographically from her relationship with her father and his activist politics.

Hoss recorded a duet with the Welsh rock band Manic Street Preachers called "Europa geht durch mich" ("Europe goes through me") for the album Futurology which was released on 7 July 2014. Hoss features on the 2021 album Bright Magic by Public Service Broadcasting.

She stars in Tár alongside Cate Blanchett as Sharon Goodnow, a violin player who is the partner of conductor Lydia Tár. In the film, Hoss plays the concertmaster of an orchestra, a rare position for a woman.

Other activities

Hoss has been a member of the juries of the Locarno International Film Festival in 2009, the Berlin International Film Festival in 2011 and the 73rd Venice International Film Festival in 2016.

In addition, Hoss was a jury member of the German Film Academy's First Steps awards for young filmmakers in 2000. She served as the sole judge of the 2012 Alfred Kerr Acting Prize at the Berliner Theatertreffen. In 2018, she was part of the jury that awarded the first-ever Wortmeldungen Prize for Literature of the Crespo Foundation.

Since 2019, Hoss has been a member of the Academy of Motion Picture Arts and Sciences.

Social and political commitment
Hoss supports the Make Poverty History campaign and fights female genital mutilation. She is quoted as saying, "For me, genital mutilation, torture, is one of the worst crimes in the name of so-called honour on earth. I dream that it will be possible for this form of domination over women to be abandoned." In continuation of the work of her father she is committed as a Goodwill Ambassador of the State of Pará in Brazil against the destruction of the rain forest and to improve the living conditions of the indigenous people living there. In 2017, she joined Cate Blanchett, Lars von Trier and others in signing a petition in support of Russian director Kirill Serebrennikov and against a crack down on artistic expression.

Hoss served as an Alliance 90/The Greens delegate to the Federal Convention for the purpose of electing the President of Germany in 2004 and 2010.

Personal life
Hoss married British music producer Alex Silva in 2015 after having been in a relationship with him for 12 years. They have no children.

Hoss has received numerous state honors, including the Order of Merit of the Federal Republic of Germany (2013) and was appointed a Chevalier de l'Ordre des Arts et des Lettres in France (2015).

Filmography

Awards and nominations

Special Awards
 1997 – Goldene Kamera/Lilli Palmer Memorial Camera, A Girl Called Rosemarie
 1999 – Montreal World Film Festival, The Volcano (Der Vulkan)
 2000 – Shooting Stars Award by European Film Promotion at the Berlin International Film Festival
 2019 – Douglas Sirk Award
 2023 – Santa Barbara International Film Festival - Virtuosos Award, Tár

References

External links 

 
 
 Ensemble Schaubühne Berlin

1975 births
Living people
20th-century German actresses
21st-century German actresses
Actresses from Berlin
Actresses from Stuttgart
German film actresses
German radio actresses
German stage actresses
German television actresses
Ernst Busch Academy of Dramatic Arts alumni
Members of the Academy of Arts, Berlin
Best Actress German Film Award winners
Silver Bear for Best Actress winners
Recipients of the Cross of the Order of Merit of the Federal Republic of Germany
Recipients of the Order of Merit of Berlin
Recipients of the Order of Merit of Baden-Württemberg